Anderson River may refer to:

Anderson River (British Columbia), a tributary of the Fraser River in Canada
Anderson River (Northwest Territories), a tributary of the Beaufort Sea in Canada
Anderson River (Indiana), a tributary of the Ohio River in the US

See also
Anderson Creek (disambiguation)
Anderson Fork, a creek in Ohio